Emmendingen station is a station in Emmendingen in Baden-Württemberg, Germany. It was opened with the section of the Rhine Valley Railway from Offenburg to Freiburg on 1 August 1845.

Location 
Emmendingen station is located in the town centre of the district town of Emmendingen. Its address is Bahnhofstraße 8. The Emmendingen central bus station, which is the most important public transport node in Emmendingen, is located directly in front of the station.

History
With the construction of the state railway line of the Baden main line from Mannheim to Basel, the section from Offenburg to Freiburg was opened on 1 August 1845 and the municipality of Emmendingen was first connected to the rail network.

After a 21-month construction period, the modernised and barrier free station in Emmendingen was opened on 16 May 2014.

A 49-metre-long graffiti picture was unveiled at Emmendingen station at the end of June 2016.

Rail services
Emmendingen is located on the Rhine Valley Railway from Mannheim to Basel. Regional-Express services run to Basel and Offenburg every hour. Individual Regionalbahn services stop in Emmendingen. A pair of TGV services have been running to Paris since 9 December 2018.

References

Railway stations in Baden-Württemberg
Mannheim–Karlsruhe–Basel railway
Railway stations in Germany opened in 1845
1845 establishments in Baden
Emmendingen (district)